Edward Heath formed a total of two non-consecutive Shadow Cabinets:

First Shadow Cabinet of Edward Heath, 1965–1970
Second Shadow Cabinet of Edward Heath, 1974–1975